Ingvar Carlsson (2 April 1947 in Nyköping – 28 October 2009 in Nyköping) was a Swedish rally driver, who won two World Rally Championship events in 1989.

Career
Carlsson began his rallying career in 1966, competing in national rallies in a Volvo PV544. He won his fourth rally. Carlsson's first World Rally Championship (WRC) event came in 1974, when he drove a works Datsun 260Z on Rally de Portugal. He then drove for Fiat in an Abarth 124 on that year's RAC Rally and the 1975 Swedish Rally, where he finished fifth, ahead of teammate Markku Alen. He then spent many years driving for BMW, although he also drove for Mercedes in 1980, gaining a fifth place in Rally de Portugal as his best finish.

In 1984 he joined Mazda, initially playing a key role in developing the rear-wheel drive Group B RX-7. In 1987 Mazda introduced the Group A 323 4WD. Following the prohibition of Group B, Carlsson found himself with a competitive advantage due to his extensive experience in lesser-powered cars. Carlsson took his first WRC victory on the opening round of the 1989 season in Sweden, and also went on to win Rally New Zealand later in the year. At the end of 1991 Mazda pulled the plug on its rally programme and Carlsson retired from the WRC. He also drove for Toyota in the FIA European Rallycross Championship in 1995 (with teammate Gunde Svan) and 1996. He finished fifth in 1995 and fourth in 1996.

Death
Ingvar Carlsson died on 28 October 2009, aged 62.

WRC victories
{|class="wikitable"
! # 
!Event
!Season
!Co-driver
!Car
|-
|1
| 39th Swedish Rally
|1989
| Per Carlsson
|Mazda 323 4WD
|-
|2
| 19th Rally New Zealand
|1989
| Per Carlsson
|Mazda 323 4WD
|}

Racing record

Complete FIA European Rallycross Championship results

Division 1

References

External links
Rallybase profile
Juwra profile

1947 births
2009 deaths
Sportspeople from Örebro
Swedish rally drivers
European Rallycross Championship drivers
World Rally Championship drivers
Swedish racing drivers
Nürburgring 24 Hours drivers